Yasakhan is a 2014 Indian Tamil-language romantic drama film directed by Thuraivanan, an assistant of Sasikumar and Ameer. The film stars Mahesh, Niranjana, and Janaki. The film is about a man from Madurai who is rejected by society.

Cast 
Mahesh as Surya
Niranjana as Shalini
 Janaki as Sharadha
Jayachandran 
Samuel Chandran

Production
The film began production under the title Sithan.   Niranjana from Kerala was cast as the lead actress.

Soundtrack
Music by Satish Chakravarthy.
 'Kannadi Maname' - Haricharan (lyrics by Arivumathi)
 ‘Poo Poothathum Nee Parthathum - Bela Shende (lyrics by Yugabharathi)
‘Senthazham Poove' -  Gayathri and Kunal Kanjavala (lyrics by Yugabharathi)
 'Urangi Kidakkum Madurakulla' -  Mukesh and Aasha (lyrics by Gangai Amaren)
 'Eendra Undhan Nenjathil' - Sathish Chakravarthy (also lyrics)

Reception 
M. Suganth of The Times of India opined that "We get a longwinded lecture on being human and helping others and for a moment, we think we are not in a movie theatre but in a seminar hall". Baradwaj Rangan of The Hindu wrote that "The characters are underdeveloped. The scenes have no punch. There’s not one believable moment". A critic from Maalaimalar called the film "different".

References

2014 romantic drama films